Nusretiye can refer to:

 Nusretiye Clock Tower
 Nusretiye Mosque
 Nusretiye, Lapseki